Sultan Al-Ghamdi  (born 20 March 1992) is a Saudi football player who plays for Arar as a goalkeeper.

Club career
On 6 August 2014, Al-Taawoun signed a one-year professional contract with Sultan Al-Ghamdi. In 14 April, Sultan played his professional debut against Al-Ettifaq in the Kings Cup where they won 2–0. On 17 April 2015, Sultan played his league debut against Al-Shabab where they drew 1-1. On 27 August 2014, he and his team were lost 4-3 when they played against Al-Ittihad.On 23 May 2015, Al-Taawoun renewed Sultan Al-Ghamdi's contract for three more years. On 11 February 2016, Sultan came as a substitute against Al-Qadisah after his teammate goalkeeper Faisal Al-Merqeb was injured in the 38th minute, but they won 2–1. On 20 February 2017, Sultan played his first AFC Champions League match against Lokomotiv where they won 1–0.

Statistics
As of 20 September 2017

References

External links
 

1992 births
Living people
Saudi Arabian footballers
Al-Ahli Saudi FC players
Al-Taawoun FC players
Al-Ain FC (Saudi Arabia) players
Al-Jabalain FC players
Al-Ansar FC (Medina) players
Arar FC players
Al-Orobah FC players
Saudi Professional League players
Saudi First Division League players
Saudi Second Division players
Association football goalkeepers
Place of birth missing (living people)